Valeriu Lupu (born 24 January 1991) is a Romanian footballer who plays as a left-sided full back for Liga IV club FC Bolintin Malu Spart.

Career
While playing for Steaua II București, Valeriu was loaned out to Unirea Urziceni. He made his Liga I debut on 11 September 2010, in a match against Steaua București.

Honours

Statistics 

Statistics accurate as of match played 14 December 2014

References

1991 births
Living people
People from Bolintin-Vale
Association football defenders
Romanian footballers
Romania under-21 international footballers
Liga I players
Liga II players
FC Steaua București players
FC Unirea Urziceni players
FC Universitatea Cluj players
AFC Săgeata Năvodari players
CS Sportul Snagov players